Suriname competed in the 2015 Pan American Games in Toronto, Canada from July 10 to 26, 2015.

On July 4, 2015 a team of 9 athletes in 5 sports was announced to represent the country at the games.

Swimmer Chinyere Pigot was the flagbearer for the team during the opening ceremony.

Competitors
The following table lists Suriname's delegation per sport and gender.

Athletics

Suriname qualified two athletes.

Men

Women

Badminton

Suriname qualified a team of two athletes (one man and one woman).

Cycling

Track cycling
Suriname qualified one athlete.
Keirin

Sprint

Swimming

Suriname qualified three swimmers (one male and two females).

Taekwondo

Suriname qualified one male athlete.

Men

See also
Suriname at the 2016 Summer Olympics

References

Nations at the 2015 Pan American Games
P
2015